Survivor: The Amazon is the sixth season of the American CBS competitive reality television series Survivor. The season was filmed from November 11, 2002, through December 15, 2002, in the Amazon and premiered on February 13, 2003. Hosted by Jeff Probst, it consisted of the usual 39 days of gameplay with 16 competitors. 

This was the first Survivor season to initially divide the tribes by gender. At the live finale, swimsuit model Jenna Morasca, won and was named Sole Survivor after defeating Matthew von Ertfelda by a jury vote of 6-1.

Contestants

The cast is composed of 16 new players initially divided into two tribes by gender: the all-female Jaburu (named for a native stork) and the all-male Tambaqui (a native fish). They were eventually merged into the Jacaré (Portuguese for "alligator") tribe when ten contestants remained.

Christy Smith became the first reality show contestant with a disability overall, and as well to compete in any edition of Survivor.

Future appearances
A challenge during the season in which Jenna Morasca and Heidi Strobel removed their clothing ultimately led to a cover shot and nude pictorial in a Playboy spread.

Morasca and Rob Cesternino later competed in Survivor: All-Stars. Outside of Survivor, in 2005 Morasca competed on a "Reality All-Stars" episode of Fear Factor. In 2011, Morasca appeared on The Amazing Race 19 with her then-boyfriend and winner of Survivor: Africa Ethan Zohn.

Season summary
The season began with the contestants divided into tribes split by gender for the first time. The men's tribe, Tambaqui, wearing blue, was quick to get their camp life squared away, building shelter, and alliances were quickly formed. The women's tribe, Jaburu, wearing yellow, experienced quarreling within their tribe, and spent almost the entire first week without a shelter. On Tambaqui, an alliance of four was formed, led by Roger, which included Butch, Alex, and Dave. However, Rob quickly emerged as an arbiter between Roger's alliance and the outliers of the tribe, solidifying allegiances with both. On Jaburu, the younger women, Heidi, Jenna, and Shawna quickly began to coalesce, pulling in Deena and Christy to control the voting on Jaburu.

On Day 13, Dave and Jenna traveled to an isolated location to act as tribal ambassadors. Jenna gave Dave crucial information about Jaburu, giving Dave an advantage when, the next day, they were forced to choose new tribes, equally distributing the men and the women. Rob, Matthew and Alex were sent to Jaburu while Heidi, Jeanne and Christy were sent to Tambaqui. At Tambaqui, Heidi decided to align with the men to vote off Jeanne. At Jaburu, the men and women joined forces to vote off an untrustworthy Shawna. Deena and Rob created an alliance and when the merge occurred, they aligned with Alex, Matthew and the rest of the women. At the merge, Deena and Rob's alliance controlled the votes against sexist Roger and physical and mental threat Dave. leaving Butch as the last player remaining outside of Rob and Deena's alliance.

Convinced she had control over the game, Deena decided to spare Butch in order to vote out Alex for being a social and physical threat. The women quickly informed Alex of Deena's betrayal and he was able to convince Heidi, Jenna and the men to eliminate Deena at the next Tribal Council. With Deena gone, Alex was convinced he was solid in an alliance of four with Jenna, Heidi, and Rob. However, he revealed to Rob that his plan was to vote him out at the final four to avoid a tie with Heidi and Jenna. Rob used this information to form a counter-alliance with Matthew, Butch, and Christy, where they voted out Alex. With three men and three women remaining, Christy became the swing vote but was voted out after failing to commit to either side. The next Tribal Council, the men stuck together and voted off Heidi, perceived to be the more physical of the two women left.

At the Final Four, Jenna, the final woman remaining, won immunity, forcing the men to prematurely turn on themselves. Faced with either avenging Alex and Heidi by voting off Rob or getting rid of an undeserving Butch, she voted with Matthew and Rob to vote off Butch. Jenna continued her winning streak and won immunity again, giving her the sole vote at the penultimate Tribal Council leaving Rob and Matthew at the mercy of Jenna. She eliminated Rob due to his strong strategic gameplay. Facing the jury, Matthew was praised for his survival skills and work ethic, but he was criticized for hypocrisy and lack of strategic gameplay for the majority of the game. On the other hand, Jenna was criticized for her lack of work ethic and even wanting to quit a few days earlier. However, as a result of having better relationships with people on the jury, and being seen as playing the game more strategically from the beginning, Jenna was voted to become the Sole Survivor in a vote of 6-1.

In the case of multiple tribes or castaways who win reward or immunity, they are listed in order of finish, or alphabetically where it was a team effort; where one castaway won and invited others, the invitees are in brackets.

Episodes

Voting history

Note

Reception

Reception to Survivor: The Amazon was mostly positive with common praise being the tribe division by gender and bearing colorful players such as Rob Cesternino. Jeff Probst ranked The Amazon as his 10th favorite season, citing the women's alliance led by Jenna, among other factors. Dalton Ross, the official Survivor columnist of Entertainment Weekly, ranked it as his seventh favorite season, calling it "probably the most unpredictable season ever." In 2012 and 2013, "Survivor Oz" ranked The Amazon in the top 10 greatest seasons in its annual polls ranking every season of the series; it was 9th in 2012 and 7th in 2013. In the official issue of CBS Watch commemorating the 15th anniversary of Survivor, The Amazon was voted by viewers as the 8th greatest season of the series. Also, in another poll for the same magazine, Rob was voted as the #3 greatest player in the series for his performance in The Amazon. In 2015, when Rob himself eventually held a poll on his reality TV podcasting website, The Amazon was ranked by his viewers as the 5th-greatest season in the series; Rob himself personally ranked it as the seventh-greatest. This was updated in 2021 during Cesternino's podcast, Survivor All-Time Top 40 Rankings, ranking 8th. In 2020, "Purple Rock Podcast" ranked this season 14th out of 40 saying that "this season earns its rank based on several memorable moments of both gameplay and comedy." Later in the year, Inside Survivor ranked this season 8th out of 40 saying "The Amazon takes Survivor strategy to new heights, which makes for exciting and unpredictable television."

References

External links
 Official CBS Survivor The Amazon Website

Amazonas (Brazilian state)
06
2003 American television seasons
2002 in Brazil
Television shows set in Brazil
Television shows filmed in Amazonas (Brazilian state)